El Tehuelche Airport (Welsh: Maes Awyr El Tehuelche)  is an airport  northwest of Puerto Madryn, a city on Golfo Nuevo in the Chubut Province of Argentina.

Airlines and destinations

Infrastructure

Statistics

See also
Transport in Argentina
List of airports in Argentina

References

External links 

Airports in Chubut Province